The 1964 NC State Wolfpack football team represented North Carolina State University during the 1964 NCAA University Division football season. The Wolfpack were led by 11th-year head coach Earle Edwards and played their home games at Riddick Stadium in Raleigh, North Carolina. They competed as a member of the Atlantic Coast Conference, finishing as conference champions with a record of 5–2.

Schedule

References

NC State
NC State Wolfpack football seasons
Atlantic Coast Conference football champion seasons
NC State Wolfpack football